Emil Wrażeń (born 21 February 1992 in Poland) is a Polish footballer.

Career

After making over 31 league appearances and seven goals with KS Piaseczno in the Polish fourth division, Wrażeń signed for Widzew Łódź in the top flight. However, despite making a league appearance with the club, he left after two unsuccessful loans with Ruch Radzionków and Ząbkovia Ząbki in the lower leagues.

In 2012, he signed for GKP Targówek in the fourth division, where he was accused of faking injury and placed with the reserves.

Despite receiving many offers after scoring 28 goals in the fifth division with LKS Sparta Jazgarzew, Wrażeń decided to stay put due to having a secure job.

He was tied with four players as the top scorer of the 2014–15 Polish Cup.

References

External links
 Emil Wrażeń at 90minut

Polish footballers
Living people
Association football forwards
1992 births
Widzew Łódź players
Ruch Radzionków players
Ząbkovia Ząbki players